Aina Dumlao (born October 12, 1988) is a Filipino-American actress best known for her roles as Andie Lee in MacGyver (2016), Natalie in Ballers (2018), Gerlie Bernardo in Grey's Anatomy (2021), and Evie Dela Rosa in the limited series The Unusual Suspects (2021).

Early life 
Dumlao was born in Quezon City, Philippines where her mother Eufrosina still lives.

Acting career 
In 2015, Dumlao was cast in her first television role in the short-lived series State of Affairs (2015) produced by and starring Katherine Heigl. In 2017, Dumlao was cast in the CBS series MacGyver (2016) as Phoenix Foundation agent Andie Lee. Dumlao recurred from seasons 1-2 as the personal assistant of Patricia Thornton (Sandrine Holt), Director of Field Operations for the DXS and the Phoenix Foundation. Dumlao also played Hank Azaria's on-screen wife in an episode of IFC's Brockmire (2017), followed by a recurring role in HBO's Ballers (2017) where she played Spencer (Dwayne Johnson) and Joe's (Rob Corddry) disgruntled, ax-wielding employee.

Dumlao played her first feature film lead role in the thriller Sanzaru (2020), premiered at Slamdance in 2020.

Dumlao guest starred as Gerlie Bernardo in the season 17 finale of Grey's Anatomy as the first Filipino-American nurse headlining the medical drama.

Dumlao headlined The Unusual Suspects (2021). Dumlao plays a nanny, Evie De La Rosa, who is a godmother of sorts for other Filipino domestic workers in the rich suburbs of Sydney.

Filmography

References

External links 
 

1988 births
Living people
American people of Filipino descent
Filipino television actresses
People from Quezon City